Robyn Eileen Munford  is a New Zealand social work researcher, and professor in the School of Social Work at Massey University. Her research concerns community development, young people's pathway to adulthood, and disability studies.

Academic career
Munford completed a Bachelor of Social Work at Massey University in 1978, and then Master of Social Work at the University of Calgary in 1983. Her 1989 PhD thesis at Massey University was titled The hidden costs of caring : women who care for people with intellectual disabilities. She joined the staff at Massey University in 1991, and rose to full professor. Munford is the co-editor of the journal Qualitative Social Work, and is an adjunct professor in disability studies at York University.

In the 2002 Queen's Birthday and Golden Jubilee Honours, Munford was appointed an Officer of the New Zealand Order of Merit, for services to social work education and policy. In 2006 she received a Massey University Research Medal for her supervision of postgraduates. She was a finalist in the Public Policy Category of the 2015 Women of Influence Award (New Zealand).

Research
Munford has undertaken several recent research projects, including Pathways to Resilience (funded by MBIE), and the Long-term Successful Youth Transitions Study (LtSYT), with her Massey colleague Jackie Sanders. LtSYT examines the major transitions in the lives of high-risk young people between the ages of 13 and 17 – leaving school, higher education, employment, independence, and establishing an identity – and looks at the pathways that led to resilience and how those could be supported. This 10-year longitudinal study is due to finish in 2022. Her recent research with Sanders looks at the significant influence of shame and recognition amongst 12–17 year olds transitioning to adulthood, and how social workers can recognise this and better support them.

As part of the Youth Transitions Project, Munford and Sanders created an online tool, the PARTH model, for people working with vulnerable youth. Based on 107 detailed case studies from 593 participant, the model is designed to help youth workers make better decisions, and builds on a similar international study led by Michael Ungar at Dalhousie University. Munford and Sanders have also prepared guidelines for employers working with young people, particularly helping them transition into work.

Selected works

References

External links
  
 

Living people
Year of birth missing (living people)
New Zealand women academics
Massey University alumni
Academic staff of the Massey University
New Zealand social workers